Xanthotoxol is a furanocoumarin. It is one of the major active ingredients in Cnidium monnieri.

Metabolism 
 Xanthotoxol O-methyltransferase (8-hydroxyfuranocoumarin 8-O-methyltransferase) is an enzyme that uses S-adenosyl methionine and xanthotoxol to produce S-adenosylhomocysteine and O-methylxanthotoxol (xanthotoxin or methoxsalen).

References 

Furanocoumarins
Phenols